Dan White is a former Ohio House of Representatives member who was appointed to replace Kathleen Walcher in 2006.

He lost the 2006 election for the seat to Matt Barrett.

References 

Democratic Party members of the Ohio House of Representatives
Living people
21st-century American politicians
Year of birth missing (living people)